The EUROSAF Champions Sailing Cup is a series of sailing regattas that started in 2013. The series features boats which feature at the Olympics and Paralympics.

Seasons

Winners

Men's 470

Men's 49er

Men's Finn

Men's Laser

Men's RS:X

Women's 470

Women's 49erFX

Women's Laser Radial

Women's RS:X

Mixed Nacra 17

Open 2.4mR

Open SKUD

Open Sonar

See also
ISAF Sailing World Cup

References

External links
 Official website

 
EUROSAF
Sailing competitions in Europe
Sailing series
Recurring sporting events established in 2013